Jorge Antonio Ricardo (born September 30, 1961, in Rio de Janeiro, Brazil) is a jockey in South American Thoroughbred horse racing who became the highest tally winning rider in the sport on 5 February 2007. He has since been passed by Canadian-born, California-based rider Russell Baze, but on 6 February 2018 he equaled Baze's record of 12,844 wins, and surpassed that record some six weeks later.

Biography 

Ricardo was born into a jockey family; his father and two uncles were both jockeys. Since making his professional racing debut in 1976, he tallied 400 race wins in one year on five occasions and has been Brazil's leading tally-winning jockey for twenty-five consecutive years from 1982 through 2006.

From 1982 to 2011, he has won 29 yearly riding titles – 26 in Brazil and 3 in Argentina.

He won more than 160 Grade 1 races, including the “Gran Premio Asociación Latinoamericana de Jockey Clubes e Hipódromos” on five occasions.

The highest tally-winning horse he rode was **Much Better**.

In 1993, he beat the existing Brazilian record by winning 477 races in one year. In 2008, Ricardo beat the existing Argentinian record by winning 465 races in one year.

Competing at the Hipodromo Argentino de Palermo in Palermo, Buenos Aires, Ricardo won his 9,981st career race (up to 29 December 2007) to surpass the still active Canadian-born jockey Russell Baze as the all-time leader in racing wins. On 9 January 2008, Ricardo earned his 10,000th win riding Membresia in the 11th race at San Isidro in Buenos Aires.

On May 26, 2013, he reached 12,000 career victories. At this point, he had the world record of race wins. On February 6, 2018, Ricardo won his 12,844th race on Jubiliea to equal the record of the now-retired Baze.

Notes

References
  Jorge Ricardo vs. Russel Baze (English language)
 Breedingracing : Ricardo sets a new World Record
 Story on Ricardo's pursuit of 10,000 victories.
 Profile of Jorge Ricardo at JockeysRoom.com
 May 2012 Racing Post article Ricardo surpasses Baze to regain world record

1961 births
Living people
Brazilian jockeys
Sportspeople from Rio de Janeiro (city)